The 2002 Champion Hurdle was a horse race held at Cheltenham Racecourse on Tuesday 12 March 2002. It was the 72nd running of the Champion Hurdle.

The race was won by Paul Green's Hors La Loi III, a seven-year-old French-bred gelding trained at Newmarket, Suffolk by James Fanshawe and ridden by Dean Gallagher. His victory was the first in the race for his owner and jockey. Fanshawe had previously won the race with Royal Gait in 1992.

Hors La Loi II started at odds of 10/1 and won by three lengths from the 25/1 outsider Marble Arch, with the French mare Bilboa in third. Istabraq who had won the race in 1998, 1999 and 2000 started the 2/1 favourite but was pulled up after jumping the first two hurdles. The second favourite Valiramix was fatally injured when he slipped and fell approaching the second last. Twelve of the fifteen runners completed the course.

Race details
 Sponsor: Smurfit
 Purse: £270,000; First prize: £156,600
 Going: Good to Soft
 Distance: 2 miles 110 yards
 Number of runners: 15
 Winner's time: 3m 53.80

Full result

 Abbreviations: nse = nose; nk = neck; hd = head; dist = distance; UR = unseated rider; PU = pulled up; LFT = left at start; SU = slipped up

Winner's details
Further details of the winner, Hors La Loi III
 Sex: Gelding
 Foaled: 22 February 1995
 Country: France
 Sire: Cyborg; Dam: Quintessence III (El Condor)
 Owner: Paul Green
 Breeder: François Cottin

References

Champion Hurdle
 2002
Champion Hurdle
Champion Hurdle
2000s in Gloucestershire